Katariina Meri-Tuulia Pantila (born Katariina Hyttinen, first marriage Katariina Lönnqvist, 1981 - March 8, 2010) was a Finnish murderer and nurse.

Activities
In March 2007, Pantila, a nurse, gave a baby an injection of insulin at a family gathering. A few days later she murdered a mentally disabled patient she was caring for. She was apprehended, put on trial and convicted of the murder of the patient and the attempted murder of the baby.

Personal life
Pantila was born Katariina Hyttinen in 1981, her surname changing to Lönnqvist from her first marriage. During her criminal trial was her divorce, and she later married again in prison, where her surname was Pantila from then on.

In March 2010, Pantila was found dead in her prison cell.

References

See also
Other nurses convicted of murdering patients:

Abraão José Bueno
Edson Isidoro Guimarães
Aino Nykopp-Koski
Catherine Wilson

Finnish female murderers
Nurses convicted of killing patients
1981 births
2010 deaths